Donald Hugh MacBride (June 23, 1893 – June 21, 1957) was an American character actor on stage, in films, and on television who launched his career as a teenage singer (making several recordings in 1907) in vaudeville and went on to be an actor in New York.

Biography
Donald MacBride was born 1893 in Brooklyn, New York.

MacBride appeared in nearly 140 films between 1914 and 1955. His year of birth is given variously as 1889 or 1893 in the standard reference books.

Motion pictures
Beginning in 1930, like many New York-based, stage-trained actors, he found work at the Paramount, Vitaphone, and Educational studios, all of which had East Coast branches. He is clearly visible as a crowd extra welcoming Groucho Marx in the Paramount feature Animal Crackers. Speaking roles in short subjects followed, establishing MacBride as a comic tough guy or villain opposite Tom Howard, Shemp Howard, Buster Keaton, and other comedy stars.

MacBride's fortunes improved when he was featured in the hit play Room Service. In this farce comedy about a shoestring producer and his desperate associates trying to avoid eviction from a hotel, MacBride played the no-nonsense hotel manager, who frequently met bad news with an explosive "Oh, God damn!"

RKO Radio Pictures bought the film rights to Room Service as a vehicle for The Marx Brothers, and brought many of the Broadway cast members to Hollywood, including Donald MacBride reprising his role (with his catchphrase sanitized to "Jumping butterballs!"). Hollywood producers noticed MacBride's comic timing and he was established overnight as a skilled character actor. Like fellow character comedian Edgar Kennedy, MacBride specialized in the comedy of frustration, and his portrayals showed the harried MacBride enduring various indignities quietly and gradually until he finally reached a boiling point. He often played police inspectors, detectives, military officers, and other authority figures, all of whom were tormented by the leading players in the films.

MacBride signed a non-exclusive RKO contract, allowing him to freelance among the major studios for the next several years. In 1947, with the larger studios cutting down on the number of films in production, MacBride accepted featured roles at smaller studios: Monogram, Republic, and Lippert. He continued to work at the larger studios, but often in small or uncredited roles.

MacBride was an early arrival in the new field of television, having appeared in the pioneering series Public Prosecutor in 1947. He continued to work in television until shortly before his death.

Death
MacBride died on 1957 in Los Angeles, California of a heart ailment. He was buried in Holy Cross Cemetery, Culver City, California. Survivors included his wife and a stepson, Jack Craddock.

Selected filmography

 The Daring of Diana (1916) - Jimmy Towne
 Hesper of the Mountains (1916) - Baker
 The Fettered Woman (1917) - Jack Wolver
 The Shell Game (1918) - Vocal Teacher
 The Capitol (1919) - Jimmy Vincent
 Animal Crackers (1930) - House Party Guest (uncredited)
 His Woman (1931) - Crewman (uncredited)
 Wayward (1932) - Taxicab Driver (uncredited)
 Misleading Lady (1932) - Bill - Asylum Guard
 Buzzin' Around (1933, Short) - Policeman (uncredited)
 Moonlight and Pretzels (1933) - Business Associate (uncredited)
 Get That Venus (1933) - (uncredited)
 The Chemist (1936, Short) - Gangster
 Room Service (1938) - Gregory Wagner
 Annabel Takes a Tour (1938) - Thompson, RR Conductor
 Blondie Takes a Vacation (1938) - Harvey Morton
 The Great Man Votes (1939) - Iron Hat McCarthy
 Twelve Crowded Hours (1939) - Detective Sergeant Joe Keller
 The Story of Vernon and Irene Castle (1939) - Hotel Manager
 The Flying Irishman (1939) - Mr. Roy Thompson
 The Girl from Mexico (1939) - L. B. Renner
 The Gracie Allen Murder Case (1939) - Dist. Atty. John Markham
 The Girl and the Gambler (1939) - Mike Bascom
 Blondie Takes a Vacation (1939) - Harvey Morton
 Charlie Chan at Treasure Island (1939) - Chief J.J. Kilvaine
 The Amazing Mr. Williams (1939) - Police Lieutenant Bixler
 The Saint's Double Trouble (1940) - John Bohlen
 Northwest Passage (1940) - Sergeant McNott
 Curtain Call (1940) - Geoffrey 'Jeff' Crandall
 My Favorite Wife (1940) - Hotel Clerk
 Wyoming (1940) - Bart - Henchman (uncredited)
 Hit Parade of 1941 (1940) - Harrison
 Murder Over New York (1940) - Inspector Vance
 Michael Shayne: Private Detective (1940) - Chief Painter
 The Invisible Woman (1940) - Foghorn
 High Sierra (1941) - Big Mac
 Footlight Fever (1941) - Mr. Geoffrey 'Geoff' Crandall
 Topper Returns (1941) - Police Detective Roberts
 Love Crazy (1941) - 'Pinky' Grayson
 Here Comes Mr. Jordan (1941) - Inspector Williams
 You'll Never Get Rich (1941) - Top Sergeant
 Rise and Shine (1941) - Coach Graham
 Louisiana Purchase (1941) - Capt. Pierre Whitfield
 You're in the Army Now (1941) - Colonel Dobson
 Two Yanks in Trinidad (1942) - Sgt. Valentine
 Juke Girl (1942) - 'Muckeye' John
 Mexican Spitfire Sees a Ghost (1942) - Percy Fitzbadden
 The Glass Key (1942) - Farr
 My Sister Eileen (1942) - Officer Lonigan
 A Night to Remember (1942) - Bolling
 Lady Bodyguard (1943) - R. L. Barclay
 They Got Me Covered (1943) - Mason
 A Stranger in Town (1943) - Vinnie Z. Blaxton
 Best Foot Forward (1943) - Capt. Bradd
 The Doughgirls (1944) - Judge Franklin
 The Thin Man Goes Home (1944) - Police Chief MacGregor
 Practically Yours (1944) - Sam (uncredited)
 She Gets Her Man (1945) - Henry Wright
 Out of This World (1945) - J.C. Crawford
 Penthouse Rhythm (1945) - Brewster
 Abbott and Costello in Hollywood (1945) - Dennis Kavanaugh
 Hold That Blonde (1945) - Mr. Kratz
 Doll Face (1945) - Lawyer Ferguson
 Girl on the Spot (1946) - Inspector Gleason
 Little Giant (1946) - The conductor
 Blonde Alibi (1946) - Police Inspector Carmichael
 The Dark Corner (1946) - Policeman in Galleries (uncredited)
 The Dark Horse (1946) - John Rooney
 The Time of Their Lives (1946) - Lt. Mason
 The Killers (1946) - R.S. Kenyon
 The Brute Man (1946) - Police Captain M. J. Donelly
 Beat the Band (1947) - P. Aloysius Duff
 The Egg and I (1947) - Mr. Henty
 Buck Privates Come Home (1947) - Police Captain
 The Fabulous Joe (1947) - Lawyer Gilbert
 Joe Palooka in the Knockout (1947) - Crockett
 Good News (1947) - Coach Johnson
 Smart Politics (1948) - Phineas Wharton, Sr. / Phineas Wharton, Jr.
 Campus Sleuth (1948) - Insp. Watson
 Jinx Money (1948) - Police Capt. James Q. Broaderik
 The Story of Seabiscuit (1949) - George Carson
 Challenge to Lassie (1949)
 Joe Palooka Meets Humphrey (1950) - Mayor
 Holiday Rhythm (1950) - Earl E. Byrd
 Bowery Battalion (1951) - Sgt. Herbert Frisbie
 Cuban Fireball (1951) - Captain Brown
 Rhubarb (1951) - Pheeny
 Texas Carnival (1951) - Concessionaire #2
 The Stooge (1951) - Diner Proprietor (uncredited)
 Two Tickets to Broadway (1951) - Bus Terminal Guard Arresting Carter (uncredited)
 Sailor Beware (1952) - Chief Bos'n Mate (uncredited)
 Meet Danny Wilson (1952) - Police Desk Sergeant
 Gobs and Gals (1952) - Cmdr. J.E. Gerrens
 The Seven Year Itch (1955) - Mr. Brady (final film role)

References

External links

 
 
 

1893 births
1957 deaths
American male film actors
American male silent film actors
American male stage actors
American male television actors
Male actors from New York City
20th-century American male actors
People from Brooklyn